Kamlesh Kumar Pathak is a leader of the Samajwadi Party in Uttar Pradesh. On 10 June 2016, he was elected to the Uttar Pradesh Legislative Council.

References 

Year of birth missing (living people)
Living people
Members of the Uttar Pradesh Legislative Council
Samajwadi Party politicians
Samajwadi Party politicians from Uttar Pradesh